Jan Dołgowicz (born 21 December 1954 in Skarbiewo) is a Polish wrestler who competed in the 1980 Summer Olympics.

Silver medalist at the 1980 Summer Olympics in wrestling in 82 kg category (middleweight).

External links
sports-reference

1954 births
Living people
Olympic wrestlers of Poland
Wrestlers at the 1980 Summer Olympics
Polish male sport wrestlers
Olympic silver medalists for Poland
Olympic medalists in wrestling
People from Bydgoszcz County
Sportspeople from Kuyavian-Pomeranian Voivodeship
Medalists at the 1980 Summer Olympics
20th-century Polish people
21st-century Polish people